Clownfish or anemonefish are fishes from the subfamily Amphiprioninae in the family Pomacentridae. Thirty species of clownfish are recognized: one in the genus Premnas, while the remaining are in the genus Amphiprion. In the wild, they all form symbiotic mutualisms with sea anemones. Depending on the species, anemonefish are overall yellow, orange, or a reddish or blackish color, and many show white bars or patches.

Distribution and habitat
Anemonefish are endemic to the warmer waters of the Indian Ocean, including the Red Sea, and Pacific Ocean, the Great Barrier Reef, Southeast Asia, Japan, and the Indo-Malaysian region. While most species have restricted distributions, others are widespread. Anemonefish typically live at the bottom of shallow seas in sheltered reefs or in shallow lagoons. No anemonefish are found in the Atlantic.

Diet
Anemonefish are omnivorous and can feed on undigested food from their host anemones, and the fecal matter from the anemonefish provides nutrients to the sea anemone. Anemonefish primarily feed on small zooplankton from the water column, such as copepods and tunicate larvae, with a small portion of their diet coming from algae, with the exception of Amphiprion perideraion, which primarily feeds on algae.

Symbiosis and mutualism 
Anemonefish and sea anemones have a symbiotic, mutualistic relationship, each providing many benefits to the other. The individual species are generally highly host specific. The sea anemone protects the anemonefish from predators, as well as providing food through the scraps left from the anemone's meals and occasional dead anemone tentacles, and functions as a safe nest site. In return, the anemonefish defends the anemone from its predators and parasites. The anemone also picks up nutrients from the anemonefish's excrement. The nitrogen excreted from anemonefish increases the number of algae incorporated into the tissue of their hosts, which aids the anemone in tissue growth and regeneration. The activity of the anemonefish results in greater water circulation around the sea anemone, and it has been suggested that their bright coloring might lure small fish to the anemone, which then catches them. Studies on anemonefish have found that they alter the flow of water around sea anemone tentacles by certain behaviors and movements such as "wedging" and "switching". Aeration of the host anemone tentacles allows for benefits to the metabolism of both partners, mainly by increasing anemone body size and both anemonefish and anemone respiration.

Bleaching of the host anemone can occur when warm temperatures cause a reduction in algal symbionts within the anemone. Bleaching of the host can cause a short-term increase in the metabolic rate of resident anemonefish, probably as a result of acute stress. Over time, however, there appears to be a down-regulation of metabolism and a reduced growth rate for fish associated with bleached anemones. These effects may stem from reduced food availability (e.g. anemone waste products, symbiotic algae) for the anemonefish.

Several theories are given about how they can survive the sea anemone poison:

 The mucus coating of the fish may be based on sugars rather than proteins. This would mean that anemones fail to recognize the fish as a potential food source and do not fire their nematocysts, or sting organelles.
 The coevolution of certain species of anemonefish with specific anemone host species may have allowed the fish to evolve an immunity to the nematocysts and toxins of their hosts. Amphiprion percula may develop resistance to the toxin from Heteractis magnifica, but it is not totally protected since it was shown experimentally to die when its skin, devoid of mucus, was exposed to the nematocysts of its host.

Anemonefish are the best known example of fish that are able to live among the venomous sea anemone tentacles, but several others occur, including juvenile threespot dascyllus, certain cardinalfish (such as Banggai cardinalfish), incognito (or anemone) goby, and juvenile painted greenling.

Reproduction

In a group of anemonefish, a strict dominance hierarchy exists. The largest and most aggressive female is found at the top. Only two anemonefish, a male and a female, in a group reproduce – through external fertilization. Anemonefish are protandrous sequential hermaphrodites, meaning they develop into males first, and when they mature, they become females. If the female anemonefish is removed from the group, such as by death, one of the largest and most dominant males becomes a female. The remaining males move up a rank in the hierarchy. Clownfish live in a hierarchy, like Hyenas, except smaller and based on size not gender, and order of joining/birth.

Anemonefish lay eggs on any flat surface close to their host anemones. In the wild, anemonefish spawn around the time of the full moon. Depending on the species, they can lay hundreds or thousands of eggs. The male parent guards the eggs until they hatch about 6–10 days later, typically two hours after dusk.

Parental investment
Anemonefish colonies usually consist of the reproductive male and female and a few male juveniles, which help tend the colony. Although multiple males cohabit an environment with a single female, polygamy does not occur and only the adult pair exhibits reproductive behavior. However, if the female dies, the social hierarchy shifts with the breeding male exhibiting protandrous sex reversal to become the breeding female. The largest juvenile then becomes the new breeding male after a period of rapid growth. The existence of protandry in anemonefish may rest on the case that nonbreeders modulate their phenotype in a way that causes breeders to tolerate them. This strategy prevents conflict by reducing competition between males for one female. For example, by purposefully modifying their growth rate to remain small and submissive, the juveniles in a colony present no threat to the fitness of the adult male, thereby protecting themselves from being evicted by the dominant fish.

The reproductive cycle of anemonefish is often correlated with the lunar cycle. Rates of spawning for anemonefish peak around the first and third quarters of the moon. The timing of this spawn means that the eggs hatch around the full moon or new moon periods. One explanation for this lunar clock is that spring tides produce the highest tides during full or new moons. Nocturnal hatching during high tide may reduce predation by allowing for a greater capacity for escape. Namely, the stronger currents and greater water volume during high tide protect the hatchlings by effectively sweeping them to safety. Before spawning, anemonefish exhibit increased rates of anemone and substrate biting, which help prepare and clean the nest for the spawn.

Before making the clutch, the parents often clear an oval-shaped clutch varying in diameter for the spawn.  Fecundity, or reproductive rate, of the females, usually ranges from 600 to 1500 eggs depending on her size.  In contrast to most animal species, the female only occasionally takes responsibility for the eggs, with males expending most of the time and effort. Male anemonefish care for their eggs by fanning and guarding them for 6 to 10 days until they hatch. In general, eggs develop more rapidly in a clutch when males fan properly, and fanning represents a crucial mechanism of successfully developing eggs. This suggests that males can control the success of hatching an egg clutch by investing different amounts of time and energy towards the eggs. For example, a male could choose to fan less in times of scarcity or fan more in times of abundance. Furthermore, males display increased alertness when guarding more valuable broods, or eggs in which paternity was guaranteed. Females, though, display generally less preference for parental behavior than males. All these suggest that males have increased parental investment towards the eggs compared to females.

Taxonomy
Historically, anemonefish have been identified by morphological features and color pattern in the field, while in a laboratory, other features such as scalation of the head, tooth shape, and body proportions are used. These features have been used to group species into six complexes: percula, tomato, skunk, clarkii, saddleback, and maroon. As can be seen from the gallery, each of the fish in these complexes has a similar appearance. Genetic analysis has shown that these complexes are not monophyletic groups, particularly the 11 species in the A. clarkii group, where only A. clarkii and A. tricintus are in the same clade, with six species,A. allardi A. bicinctus, A. chagosensis, A. chrosgaster, A. fuscocaudatus, A. latifasciatus, and A. omanensis being in an Indian clade, A. chrysopterus having monospecific lineage, and A. akindynos in the Australian clade with A. mccullochi. Other significant differences are that A. latezonatus also has monospecific lineage, and A. nigripes is in the Indian clade rather than with A. akallopisos, the skunk anemonefish. A. latezonatus is more closely related to A. percula and Premnas biaculeatus than to the saddleback fish with which it was previously grouped.

Obligate mutualism was thought to be the key innovation that allowed anemonefish to radiate rapidly, with rapid and convergent morphological changes correlated with the ecological niches offered by the host anemones. The complexity of mitochondrial DNA structure shown by genetic analysis of the Australian clade suggested evolutionary connectivity among samples of A. akindynos and A. mccullochi that the authors theorize was the result of historical hybridization and introgression in the evolutionary past. The two evolutionary groups had individuals of both species detected, thus the species lacked reciprocal monophyly. No shared haplotypes were found between species.

Phylogenetic relationships

Morphological diversity by complex

In the aquarium
Anemonefish make up approximately 43% of the global marine ornamental trade, and approximately 25% of the global trade comes from fish bred in captivity, while the majority is captured from the wild, accounting for decreased densities in exploited areas. Public aquaria and captive-breeding programs are essential to sustain their trade as marine ornamentals, and has recently become economically feasible. It is one of a handful of marine ornamentals whose complete lifecycle has been in closed captivity. Members of some anemonefish species, such as the maroon clownfish, become aggressive in captivity; others, like the false percula clownfish, can be kept successfully with other individuals of the same species.

When a sea anemone is not available in an aquarium, the anemonefish may settle in some varieties of soft corals, or large polyp stony corals. Once an anemone or coral has been adopted, the anemonefish will defend it. Anemonefish, however, are not obligately tied to hosts, and can survive alone in captivity.

In popular culture
In Disney Pixar's 2003 film Finding Nemo and its 2016 sequel Finding Dory main characters Nemo, his father Marlin, and his mother Coral are clownfish from the species A. ocellaris. The popularity of anemonefish for aquaria increased following the film's release; it is the first film associated with an increase in the numbers of those captured in the wild.

Notes

References

Further reading

External links

  Photo Gallery of Amphiprion ocellaris and their eggs
 Monterey Bay Aquarium: Video and information
 Clown Fish underwater photography gallery
 Aquaticcommunity.com
 Tolweb.org

Pomacentridae
Symbiosis
Articles containing video clips
Fish subfamilies
Fish of Saudi Arabia